Stuart Cameron Carruthers (born 31 March 1970 in Melbourne, Victoria) is a former field hockey player from Australia, who was a member of the Men's National Hockey Team that won the bronze medal at the 1996 Summer Olympics in Atlanta, Georgia. He now plays for the Essendon 50+ Masters team. 

His wife is Lisa Powell-Carruthers and his sister-in-law is Katrina Powell.

References
 Australian Olympic Committee
 sports-reference

External links
 

1970 births
Australian male field hockey players
Olympic field hockey players of Australia
Field hockey players at the 1996 Summer Olympics
Field hockey players from Melbourne
Living people
Olympic bronze medalists for Australia
Olympic medalists in field hockey
Medalists at the 1996 Summer Olympics
20th-century Australian people